Cheltenham High Street Halt was a railway station on the Great Western Railway's Honeybourne Line between Cheltenham and Birmingham via Stratford-upon-Avon. It opened on 1 October 1908 and closed on 30 April 1917 due to the First World War, never to be reopened.

Situated on top of an embankment, the halt was a late addition to a site upon which something much larger and grander had originally been planned but was never built which was Townsend Street Station, whose ornate facade would have occupied almost all of the East side of Townsend Street, a thoroughfare to the west of the line.

Facilities
The Halt had a pagoda-style shelter on each platform, and was unstaffed. Nothing exists today, save the steel bridge which still spans the road, now (2015) carrying a footpath.

References
  Cheltenham High St Halt

Disused railway stations in Gloucestershire
Railway stations in Great Britain opened in 1908
Railway stations in Great Britain closed in 1917
Former Great Western Railway stations
Station
Transport in Cheltenham
1908 establishments in England